Walk In can refer to:

Walk In, 1997 Hong Kong film directed by Herman Yau
The Walk-In (TV series), a British TV crime drama series
"The Walk In" (The Americans), an episode of the US TV series The Americans
Walk-in (concept)
Walk-In (comics), a 2006 comic book series
Walk-in closet
Walk-in clinic